Hang Meas HDTV is a TV channel in Cambodia. Hang Meas HDTV is part of Raksmey Hang Meas Video Group Production, a media conglomerate entertainment company in Cambodia. It claims to own a major shares (approximately 70%) of the Cambodia's entertainment industry, with a complete range of media platforms counting video and music video productions, radio station, TV station covering news, sport, and entertainment. 

The TV channel began broadcasting in 2012 and became the first channel in the country to broadcast in high-definition. Hang Meas HDTV acclaims to be consisting of a professional team which is equipped with better equipment, insights, knowledge and understanding client needs. The TV channel also exclusively owns licenses to produce the format shows such as The Voice Cambodia, Cambodian Idol, X Factor Cambodia, Cambodia's Got Talent, The Voice Kids Cambodia, Cambodian Idol Junior, Killer Karaoke Cambodia, The Mask Singer Cambodia, I am A Singer Cambodia... as well as producing the high rating and quality Khmer Drama Series, Leading Local News and Big Tour Concerts for many brands in Cambodia.

Programming 
News
 Hang Meas Live Morning Express News (Khmer: ហង្សមាសព័ត៌មានពេលព្រឹក)
Live Every Monday to Friday from 6:00-10:00 with the well-known and famous news anchor Mr. Meas Rithy

 Hang Meas Flash News 
Live Every Monday to Friday at 12:00-12:05 |15:00-15:05|18:00-18:05 |20:00-20:05 | 22:00-22:05

International Reality/game shows
 The Voice Cambodia - Completed 2 Seasons
 X Factor Cambodia - Completed 1 Season
 The Voice Kids Cambodia - Completed 2 Seasons
 Cambodian Idol  - Completed 4 Seasons
 Cambodia's Got Talent - Completed 2 Seasons
 I am a Singer Cambodia - Completed 1 Season
 Killer Karaoke Cambodia  - Completed 6 Seasons
 200 Million Money Drop - Completed 2 Seasons
 I Can See Your Voice Cambodia - Completed 2 Seasons
 The Mask Singer Cambodia - Completed 1 Season
 Don't Lose the Money Cambodia - Completed 1 Season

Upcoming shows
 Beat The Best
 Amazing Star
 Got To Dance Cambodia
 Star King Cambodia

Concert

The channel broadcasts concerts every weekend.
 Special Concert (Khmer:តន្ត្រីពិសេស)
 Branding Concert in Studio:
 Ganzberg Uber Concert 
 Cambodia Brew The Beat Concert
 Boostrong Concert 2021
 Freshy Hero Kids Concert
 M150 extra Concert
 Oishi Greentea Concert
 Hang Meas Tour Concerts at provinces (Tour Concerts are available on special events)

Khmer Drama
Hang Meas Khmer Drama broadcasting on Hang Meas HDTV every Monday - Wednesday at 19:00-20:00 and 20:00-21:00
Completed Drama:
សិសិរដូវក្នុងបេះដូង (Autumn In My Heart)
 បិសាចគួរឲ្យស្រលាញ់ (My Little Devil)
 ផ្កាថ្ម
 កូនពស់កេងកង (Pous Keng Kang)
 រាជនីភូមិគ្រឹះ
 កូនប្រសារអ្នកមាន
 រាជបុត្រកង្កែប (The Frog Prince)
 តាមដាន (Music Series)
 សង្សារមួយខែពីរខែ(Music Series)
 ប្រពន្ធបងមិនល្អមែនទេ(Music Series)
 ប្រពន្ធ (Wife)
 ម៉ែក្មេកចេញពីក្នុងព្រះចន្ទ
 ឋានសួគ៌ទារុណ
 អ្នកម៉ាក់គ្មានកូន
 ខ្ញុំមានញាណលើស (I Have A Plus Sense)
 សុំទោសមួយលានដង (Music Series)
 បើមេឃគ្មានផ្កាយ
 ម្តាយពីរ (Two Mothers)
 កញ្ញាមុខឈើ (My Office Mate)
 សុំទោសលាហើយស្នេហា (Sorry, Love Goodbye)

Sports
 King Of Fighter
 Bundesliga
 Olympic Games (License to LIVE Olympic Summer 2021 in Cambodia)

Foreign Drama
 Naagin (Khmer:ប្រពន្ធពស់)
 Korean Drama(s)

Animation series
 Regal Academy
 Winx Club
 Mia and Me

More
 Wipeout (Khmer:ល្បែងមួយលានឧបសគ្គ)
 Ultimate Fighting Championship

Availability 
Hang Meas HDTV is available and transmitter location is Tiger Beer Road in Phnom Penh, Cambodia.

See also 
 The Voice Cambodia
 Cambodian Idol

References

External links 
 Hang Meas Website
 Hang Meas HDTV's Facebook

Television stations in Cambodia
Mass media in Phnom Penh